Simple life or simple living refers to practices that promote simplicity in one's lifestyle.

Simple Life may also refer to:

Film and television 
 A Simple Life (1912 film), silent short film comedy
 The Simple Life (1919 film), silent short film comedy
 Fatty and Mabel's Simple Life, 1915 American film
 The Simple Life (1998 TV series), 1998 American sitcom
 The Simple Life, 2003–2007 American reality television series
 A Simple Life, 2011 Hong Kong film

Music

Albums 
 Simple Life (Mac McAnally album), 1990 album by Mac McAally
 Simple Life (Mason Jennings album), 2002 album by Mason Jennings
 The Simple Life (Magnet album), 2007 album by Magnet
 Simple Life (Megan and Liz EP), 2014 extended play by Megan and Liz

Songs 
 "Simple Life" (Carolyn Dawn Johnson song), 2003 song by Carolyn Dawn Johnson
 "Simple Life" (Elton John song), 1992 song by Elton John
 "Simple Life" (John Farnham song), 1996 song by John Farnham
 "Simple Life", a song by Lynyrd Skynyrd from the 2009 album God & Guns, 2009
 "Simple Life", a song by Valdy, top 20 in 1973.
 "The Simple Life", a song from the soundtrack to 2000 The Sims video game
 "The Simple Life", song by George and Ira Gershwin from A Dangerous Maid 1921
 "The Simple Life", a song by The Juan Maclean from the 2009 album The Future Will Come, 2009